The 1912 Goodall Cup Final marks the fourth inter-state ice hockey championship in Australia and the second of these championships won by New South Wales, the first being won in their home arena.

The series
Practices for the New South Wales state team was announced on 12 August 1912, inviting the following players: 
 Jim Kendall
 Les Turnbull
 T. Rowe
 W. Knowles
 Jack Pike
 S. McCarthy
 W. Smith
 Andrew Reid
 C. Deacon

Game one
23 August 1912 by the end of the first half, New South Wales was ahead 4-1. Jim Kendall scored again and increased the lead to 5-1 but the Victorian team scored one back to make the final score 5-2 and the first game of the series was won by New South Wales.

Game two
27 August 1912 the second game of the series was won by New South Wales, defeating Victoria by a score of 3-1.

Game three 
29 August 1912 New South Wales was dominating the first half of the game and by the end of the 1st half they were up by a score of 3-0. Victoria would score in the second half of the game but New South Wales returned by scoring 3 more to defeat Victoria for the third straight game by a score of 6-1. Jimmy Kendall, who received a nasty cut to his head early in the game, scored all six goals for New South Wales while Henry "Hal" Newman Reid Jr. scored the lone goal for Victoria.

Teams

Victoria
The Victoria team was made from the following players
 Keith Walker (RW)
 Henry "Hal" Newman Reid Jr. (Centre)
 Leslie Reid (LW)
 Dudley Woods
 Andrew Reid
 M. Haig (Goaltender)

New South Wales
The New South Wales team was made from the following players
 Jim Kendall (Captain)
 Jack Pike (RW)
 F. Rowe (Center)
 W. Knowles (LW)
 Les Turnbull
 C. Deakin (Goaltender)

Player statistics

Leading goaltenders
The following goaltenders led the interstate championship for goals against average.

See also

 Goodall Cup
 Ice Hockey Australia
Australian Ice Hockey League

References

Goodall Cup
1912 in Australian sport
1912 in ice hockey
Sports competitions in Sydney
1910s in Sydney